The 2022–23 season is the 83rd season in the existence of Salford City Football Club and the club's fourth consecutive season in League Two. In addition to the league, they will also compete in the 2022–23 FA Cup, the 2022–23 EFL Cup and the 2022–23 EFL Trophy.

Transfers

In

Out

Loans in

Loans out

Pre-season and friendlies
On May 24, Salford City announced their first pre-season fixture, with a trip to Chorley scheduled for 12 July. Two days later, a home friendly against Blackpool was confirmed. A third friendly match was confirmed, against Warrington Rylands 1906. On 7 June, a second home pre-season match, against Rotherham United was added to the schedule. A further two matches were added to the schedule, against Newcastle Town and Barrow. On July 12, the Ammies announced they would take part in two out of three 45-minute games against Hertha BSC and FC Halifax Town behind-closed-doors at St George's Park National Football Centre.

Competitions

Overall record

League Two

League table

Results summary

Results by round

Matches

On 23 June, the league fixtures were announced.

FA Cup

The Ammies were drawn away to Peterborough United in the first round.

EFL Cup

Salford were drawn away to Bolton Wanderers in the first round.

EFL Trophy

Salford were drawn at home to Bradford City in the second round and to Port Vale in the third round.

References

Salford City
Salford City F.C. seasons
English football clubs 2022–23 season